near Hamamatsu, Shizuoka Prefecture dates from the 14th century.

Mumon Gensen (son of Emperor Go-Daigo) founded the temple in 1371. Since 1903, Hōkō-ji has been the main temple of the Hōkō-ji sect of the Rinzai school of Buddhism.

See also 
 For an explanation of terms concerning Japanese Buddhism, Japanese Buddhist art, and Japanese Buddhist temple architecture, see the Glossary of Japanese Buddhism.

External links
Official site

Hōkō-ji temples
Rinzai temples
Buddhist temples in Shizuoka Prefecture